James E. MacLaren (April 13, 1963 – August 31, 2010) was a motivational speaker and author, noted for his record-breaking performances in the marathon and Ironman triathlon after having his left leg amputated below the knee.

MacLaren was born on 13 April 1963. He was a standout athlete in football and lacrosse at Yale University. Moreover, even before matriculating at Yale he had been a leading athlete at Vermont Academy. In 1985, at the age of 22, MacLaren lost his left leg below the knee in a motorcycle accident, and had to be defibrillated. He recovered, and went on to run the marathon in 3 hours, 16 minutes, and to finish the Ironman Hawaii in 10 hours, 42 minutes.

Then, in 1993, during the Orange County Triathlon, MacLaren was struck by a van during the bike portion of the race and collided with a signpost, rendering him a quadriplegic.

MacLaren's accident inspired members of the running community to raise funds to allow him to purchase a van he could drive with his hands. The fundraiser rose above and beyond the amount of funds necessary, and the Challenged Athletes Foundation was founded in an effort to support other disabled athletes in their efforts.

Again MacLaren recovered, and used a wheelchair. MacLaren then worked as a motivational speaker and author.

He was awarded the Arthur Ashe Courage Award at the 2005 ESPY Awards presentation. He died August 31, 2010, in his sleep.

External links
Jim MacLaren official web site
IronmanLive.com story on Jim MacLaren

American amputees
American motivational speakers
American motivational writers
American male triathletes
1963 births
2010 deaths
Yale Bulldogs football players
Vermont Academy alumni